Przeróbka ( and Troyl) is one of the administrative districts (dzielnica administracyjna) of the city of Gdańsk, Poland with the Westerplatte peninsula in the northwest.

Location 
The north of the quarter is bordered by the Bay of Gdańsk. From the east, it is bordered by the district of Stogi on the Port Island (Wyspa Portowa), from the south by Rudniki and from the west by Śródmieście, Młyniska, Letnica and Nowy Port.

From the south it is bordered by the Dead Vistula (one branch of the Vistula river) and from the west by Kashubian Channel and the Harbour Channel.

History 
The tower of Wisłoujście Fortress had been erected in 1482 and served as a light tower until 1758. The  peninsula of Westerplatte became a seaside resort in 1830. In 1904 the Kaiserhafen (Kashubian Channel) was built. In 1921 Poland had been granted the right to install an ammunition depot on the Westerplatte in the Free City of Danzig. – On 1 September 1939 the battleship Schleswig-Holstein opened fire on the Polish garrison, which was the first battle of the European theater of World War II.

The Gdańsk prison Zakład Karny w Gdańsku-Przeróbce was established in 1970. Later, Malteurop and the Maritim shipyard became important investors.

Stogi-Przeróbka (Stogi z Przeróbką) had been an administrative district with a population of 18,614 until 2010.

Tourism 
Tourist attractions:
Westerplatte, famous for the Battle of Westerplatte in 1939
Destroyed Fortifications from the twentieth-century
Monument of the Coast Defenders (Pomnik Obrońców Wybrzeża), unveiled in 1966
Wisłoujście, 17th-century fortress that used to guard the mouth of the old part of the port of Gdańsk.

Gallery

References

External links 

 Podział administracyjny Gdańska (Polish)
 gedanopedia.pl: Przeróbka (Polish)

Districts of Gdańsk